Ghazaleh Alizadeh; 15 February 1949 – 12 May 1996) was an Iranian poet and writer. Her mother was also a poet and writer. She married twice; she and her husband Bijan Elahi had a daughter called Salma.  She also adopted two girls who were survivors of the 1961 Qazvin earthquake.

Biography

She was an introvert, smart, and energetic student at school. She got her diploma in Humanities from Mahasti High School and at the same time became a vegetarian.  She received her BA in Political Sciences from Tehran University, then went to France to study philosophy and cinema at Sorbonne University. She initially went to Paris to pursue her PhD in law, but changed her major to illuminationism and wanted to write her dissertation on Molavi, but she left it due to the sudden death of her father.

She started her literary career by writing short stories in Mashhad. Her major work was the novel Khaneye Edrisiha ("The Edrissis' House" (خانه ادریسیها)). Her short stories include "The Crossroad", "After Summer", and "The In-transitory Journey", and her other novels include Two Landscapes and Tehran Nights. Some of her works have been translated into English by Rosa Jamali.

While she was suffering from cancer, she attempted suicide twice. She finally committed suicide by hanging herself from a tree in Javaher Deh in Ramsar, Mazandaran in May 1996. Her body was interred at Emamzadeh Taher cemetery.

A documentary movie, Ghazaleh Alizadeh Trial, has been produced about her life.

Books

Novels
Two views
Edrissis' House (two volumes)
Tehran's nights

Stories
"After summer"
"Impassable travel"

Other
Halls
House's dream and downfall nightmare

References

External links

 نشریه الکترونیکی سه پنج (صدای مستقل ادبیات ایران)انتشار صدای غزاله علیزاده
 دانشجویان «محاکات غزاله علیزاده» و «نقل‌گرد آفرید» را می‌بینند
 فیلم زندگی «غزاله علیزاده»اردیبهشت ماه آماده نمایش می‌شود. خبرگزاری کتاب ایران
 مستند "غزاله علیزاده" کلید می‌خورد
 نگاهی کوتاه به رمان شبهای تهران. سایت آفتاب 
 «"محاکات غزاله علیزاده" اجازه حضور نیافت»
 فیلم زندگی "غزاله علیزاده"اردیبهشت آماده نمایش می‌شود. روزنامه آفتاب یزد
 نافه، ویژه غزاله علیزاده
 به یاد غزاله علیزاده، در سایه روشن کلام
 
 Ghazaleh Alizadeh's THE HOUSE OF EDRISIS , translated by Rosa Jamali

1947 births
1996 deaths
Iranian women poets
Iranian women novelists
Iranian novelists
Suicides by hanging in Iran
University of Tehran alumni
Burials at Emamzadeh Taher
Iranian women short story writers
20th-century Iranian short story writers
People from Mashhad
20th-century Iranian women writers
20th-century Iranian poets
21st-century Iranian women writers
21st-century Iranian poets
1996 suicides